The 1118 Papal Election was held to choose the successor for Pope Paschal II, who died in Rome on 21 January 1118, after an 18-year pontificate. Pope Gelasius II was elected as his successor. The election happened during the Investiture Controversy, a conflict between supporters of the Papacy and those of the Holy Roman Emperor.  The election was held under the threat of possible violence due to the controversy. The Cardinal electors took refuge in the Benedictine monastery, S. Maria in Pallara, during the election. Within minutes of his election as pope, Gelasius II was attacked and imprisoned by the Frangipani faction, supporters of the Holy Roman Emperor. Gelasius managed to escape, but at the emperor's arrival with his army, he fled Rome and never returned.

Cardinal-electors 
The Papal bull entitled, In Nomine Domini, issued by Pope Nicholas II in 1059, declared that, to choose the successor upon the death of the incumbent pope, the cardinal-bishops would discuss and present the name of a suitable candidate, and the cardinals would subsequently ratify the nomination.

Information regarding the Cardinals during the election was compiled over 12 years later by Pandulf of Pisa, cardinal-priest of Santi Cosma e Damiano. The account is not complete. Indeed, some historians have pointed out the inaccuracy of Pandulf's account, including his list of electors, given his support for Antipope Anacletus II (1130–1138), who made him a cardinal.

Pandulf states that the election was attended by 49 cardinals: four bishops, 27 priests, and 18 deacons. Still, the account mentions the names of only 35 cardinals (four bishops, 20 priests, and 11 deacons), including the elected Gelasius. However, the status of the cardinals, priests, and deacons was unclear from the Pandulf account. In addition, several cardinals mentioned by Pandulf only obtained that position when elevated after the papal election by a later pope. Other chroniclers also made incomplete accounts.

According to the work of Rudolf Huls, the College of Cardinals had only 41 members as of January 1118: 6 bishops, 20 priests, and 15 deacons, of which the following 36 participated in the election:

Cardinal Bishops

 Crescenzio (nominated cardinal in 1100) - Cardinal-bishop of Sabina
 Pietro Senex (1102) - Cardinal-bishop of Porto
 Lamberto Scannabecchi - Cardinal-bishop of Ostia
 Vitalis (1111) - Cardinal-bishop of Albano

Cardinal Priests

 Boniface (1100) - Cardinal-Priest of S. Marco; prior cardinalium
 Benedict (1102) - Cardinal-Priest of S. Pietro in Vincoli
 Anastasius (1102) - Cardinal-Priest of S. Clemente
 Divizo (1103) - Cardinal-Priest of Ss. Silvestro e Martino
 Joannes (1106) - Cardinal-Priest of S. Cecilia
 Theobaldus (1111) - Cardinal-Priest of Ss. Giovanni e Paolo
 Rainerius (1111) - Cardinal-Priest of Ss. Marcellino e Pietro
 Corrado della Suburra (1114) - Cardinal-Priest of S. Pudenziana
 Gregory (1115) - Cardinal-Priest of S. Prisca
 Desiderius (c. 1115) - Cardinal-Priest of S. Prassede
 Deusdedit (1116) - Cardinal-Priest of S. Lorenzo in Damaso
 Gregorius (1116) - Cardinal-Priest of San Lorenzo in Lucina
 Giovanni, O.S.B. Cas. (1116) - Cardinal-Priest of S. Eusebio
 Guido, O.S.B. (1116) - Cardinal-Priest of S. Balbina
 Giovanni da Crema (1116) - Cardinal-Priest of S. Crisogono
 Saxo de Anagnia (1116) - Cardinal-Priest of S. Stefano al Monte Celio
 Petrus Pisanus (1113) - Cardinal-Priest of S. Susanna
 Amico, O.S.B. Cas. (1117) - Cardinal-Priest of Ss. Nereo ed Achilleo; Abbot of S. Vincenzo al Volturno

Cardinal Deacons

 Giovanni Gaetani, O.S.B. Cas. (1088) - Cardinal-Deacon of S. Maria in Cosmedin; Cardinal-protodeacon.
 Gregorio, OSB (c. 1108) - Cardinal-Deacon of S. Eustachio
 Romoaldo (1109) - Cardinal-Deacon of S. Maria in Via Lata
 Gregorio Gaetano (1109) - Cardinal-Deacon of S. Lucia in Septisolio
 Aldo da Ferentino (1109) - Cardinal-Deacon of Ss. Sergio e Bacco
 Teobaldo Boccapecora (1109) - Cardinal-Deacon of S. Maria Nuova
 Roscemanno, O.S.B.Cas. (1112) - Cardinal-Deacon of S. Giorgio in Velabro
 Pietro Pierleoni, OSBCluny (1113) - Cardinal-Deacon of Ss. Cosma e Damiano
 Oderisio di Sangro, O.S.B.Cas. (1112) - Cardinal-Deacon of S. Agata
 Comes (1113) - Cardinal-Deacon of S. Maria in Aquiro
 Gregorio Papareschi (1116) - Cardinal-Deacon of S. Angelo in Pescheria
 Crisogono (1117) - Cardinal-Deacon of S. Nicola in Carcere
 Enrico da Mazara (1117) - Cardinal-Deacon of S. Teodoro; Dean of the collegiate church of Mazara del Vallo, Sicily
 Crescenzio di Anagni (1117) - Cardinal-Deacon

Two subdeacons were in attendance, Nicholas, Provost of the Choir School, and Amico O.S.B. (Cluny), Abbot of Saint Lawrence outside the Walls.

Absent 
It can be established that at least two cardinal-priests, two cardinal-bishops, and a cardinal-deacon were absent:

 Giovanni Marsicano, O.S.B. (1100) - Cardinal-bishop of Tusculum
 Kuno von Urach (1107) - Cardinal-bishop of Palestrina; papal legate in France
 Boso (1109) - Cardinal-priest of S. Anastasia; papal legate in Spain
 Ugone d'Alatri (1116) - Cardinal-priest of Santi Dodici Apostoli; Governor Monte Circeo
 Giovanni, O.S.B. (1073) - Cardinal-deacon of Santa Maria in Domnica; Abbot of Subiaco

The choice of Gelasius II 
During his papacy, Paschal II waged the investiture controversy with Emperor Henry V, who had a considerable following among the aristocracy of Rome. From 6 to 11 March 1116, Paschal II presided over a general council at the Lateran Basilica, The leader of the anti-imperial opposition to Paschal's concessions to Henry was Cardinal Giovanni of Gaeta, the chancellor of the Holy Roman Church. In the council, Pope Paschal was forced to condemn his own privilegium. This was a concession that Paschal had granted to the emperor, allowing the emperor to invest bishops with his staff and ring of office. Paschal agreed to again anathematize any person who gave or received ecclesiastical titles from the hands of a layman, though he resisted the council's wish to anathematize the emperor. This action in the council by Paschal was a repudiation of the agreement he had previously reached with the emperor. It  caused great offense and anger. After many representations to the pope, Henry marched on Rome. On 5 April 1117, supporters of the emperor  forced Paschal to flee the Lateran palace. He spent his time at Montecassino, and then Benevento. There he held a synod, where he excommunicated the emperor's friend, Maurice Burdinus, the archbishop of Braga, who had been the go-between in recent negotiations. He returned to Rome to the Castel S. Angelo on 14 January 1118, where he died on 21 January.

After his death, the Cardinals took refuge in the Palladium (S. Maria in Pallara), a Benedictine monastery on the Palatine Hill, fearing the violence of supporters of the emperor. The meetings were presided over by Cardinal Petrus of Porto. He waited the three canonical days before beginning the election, having also sent a swift messenger summoning Cardinal Giovanni Gaetani, who was at Montecassino. On 24 January 1118, three days after the customary prayers and devotions, the electors unanimously chose Cardinal Giovanni Coniulo from Gaeta for the papacy, the cardinal-deacon of Santa Maria in Cosmedin and Chancellor of the Holy See. On election, he adopted the papal name Gelasius II.

Aftermath 
Shortly after his election, as the clergy and people were celebrating Gelasius' enthronement, Cenzio Frangipani, a supporter of the emperor, whose house and headquarters were next door to S. Maria in Pallara, broke into the church with his followers and assaulted the pope. The pope was seized and carried off to Frangipani's house, where he was chained and imprisoned.

Pope Gelasius II was freed by a popular uprising led by Peter, the Prefect of Rome. However, as the emperor Henry and his army approached the city, Gelasius fled from Rome to his native Gaeta on March 1, where he was ordained as a priest on 9 March 1118. He was consecrated a bishop and enthroned on 10 March. Pandulphus Pisanus was ordained a lector and an exorcist on the same day. He then fled to Pisa and ultimately to France, where he remained until his death at the Abbey of Cluny on 29 January 1119. In his absence, the papal vicar in Rome was Cardinal Petrus, the Bishop of Porto.

Notes

References

Bibliography 

 Furst, C. G. (1966). Kennen Wir die Wahlern Gelsius' II?, In: Festschrift Karl Pivec. Zum 60 Geburtstag von gewidmet Kollegen, edited by Anton Haidacher, Hans Eberhard Mayer, ed. Sprachwissenschaftliches Institut der Leopold-Franzens-Universität, 1966, pp. 69–80. 
 Gregorovius, Ferdinand  (1896). History of Rome in the Middle Ages. Volume IV. 2, second edition, revised (London: George Bell, 1896) [Book VIII chapter 2], pp. 377–389. 
 Hüls, Rudolf (1977).  Kardinal, Klerus und Kirchen Roms: 1049–1130, Tübingen: Max Niemeyer 1977. 
Jaffé, Philipp, Regesta Pontificum Romanorum ab condita ecclesia ad annum p. Chr. n. 1198 ; 2nd ed. by S. Löwenfeld, F. Kaltenbrunner, P. Ewald Vol 1. Leipzig, 1888.
 Klewitz, H. W. (1957).  Reformpapsttum und Kardinalkolleg, Darmstadt 1957. 
 Robinson, I. S. (1990).  The Papacy 1073–1198. Continuity and Innovations, Cambridge University Press 1990.

External links 
J. P. Adams, "Sede Vacante 1118 (January 21—January 24, 1118)", in: Conclave: Notes, by J. P. Adams, on Papal Elections and Conclaves from the 11th to the 21st Centuries. Retrieved: 5 August 2021.

Gelasius II - Vita Operaque

12th-century elections
1118
1118
12th-century Catholicism
1118 in Europe
Henry V, Holy Roman Emperor